Deep Creek is a  tributary of the Appomattox River in the U.S. state of Virginia. It rises in Nottoway County northwest of Crewe 0.5 miles (0.8 km) west of State Route 49 (Watsons Wood Rd) and flows northeast into Amelia County. SR 153 (Military Road), crosses Deep Creek 3.66 mi (5.89 km) southwest of the creek's mouth.

See also
List of rivers of Virginia

References

USGS Hydrologic Unit Map - State of Virginia (1974)

Rivers of Virginia
Tributaries of the James River
Rivers of Nottoway County, Virginia
Rivers of Amelia County, Virginia